Mezher (Dzaghgatzor) is a small town in the Matn District of the Mount Lebanon Governorate. Mezher is administered by the municipality of Bsalim / Mezher / Majzoub.

Population 
It is a new town, where most of the population is Armenian. In Mezher the Armenian community has one of the top Armenian schools, Arslanian College and a socio-cultural sport club, Aghpalian. Most of the Armenians of Mezher come from Bourj Hamoud, Achrafieh, Anjar and the other old Armenian quarters.

Famous people
Garo Agopian   - Folk singer.
Li Mezher - Model

See also 
Armenians in Lebanon
Bourj Hamoud
Anjar
Antelias

Populated places in the Matn District
Armenian communities in Lebanon